Lorne is an unincorporated community in Minnesota Falls Township, Yellow Medicine County, in the U.S. state of Minnesota.

History
Lorne was laid out in 1898, and named for Marquess of Lorne, a Governor General of Canada (1878–1883). A post office was established at Lorne in 1905, and remained in operation until 1935.

References

Unincorporated communities in Yellow Medicine County, Minnesota
Unincorporated communities in Minnesota